The first edition of the ATP tournament in Umag was held from 14 May until 20 May 1990.

Goran Prpić won the title by defeating Goran Ivanišević 6–3, 4–6, 6–4 in the final.

Seeds

Draw

Finals

Top half

Bottom half

References

External links
 Official results archive (ATP)
 Official results archive (ITF)

Yugoslav Open - Singles
1990 Singles
1990 in tennis